CFAV Quest  was an oceanographic research/acoustic vessel used by the Royal Canadian Navy and Defence Research and Development Canada. It was the only ship with this capability in the fleet. Based out of Halifax, Nova Scotia, Quests crew were civilian members of the Canadian Department of National Defence and the ship was classified as an auxiliary vessel (CFAV). In 2016 it was announced the ship was to be divested and ultimately decommissioned by the end of the year.

Design
The Quest-class oceanographic research vessel was designed for oceanographic and hydrographic research for the Royal Canadian Navy. The ship was fitted with a small helicopter platform capable of handling light helicopters but this was later removed and converted to a rear crane platform.

Quest was a diesel electric, twin shaft, twin rudder ship. The vessel was equipped with two 10-cylinder Fairbanks-Morse 38D8 diesel engines driving two GE electric motors.

Operational history
Construction of Quest began in 1967 by Burrard Shipbuilding & Drydock Ltd. at Vancouver, the ship was launched on 9 July 1968. After entering service on 21 August 1969 with the hull number AGOR 172, Quest was deployed on the East Coast. The vessel was used primarily for oceanographic and hydrographic research in the north Atlantic Ocean and the Arctic Ocean. The ship was able to operate in the heavy ice of the Arctic Ocean when accompanied by an icebreaker.

A mid-life update was performed in 1997–1999. This included updated communications and navigational hardware along with improved noise insulation. As of February 2014, Quest was docked indefinitely at Halifax following budget cutbacks to the Royal Canadian Navy. On 2 September 2016 the Royal Canadian Navy announced through an email release that the ship would be decommissioned and "divested". In June Marine Recycling Corporation of Port Colborne, Ontario secured a CAD$12.6 million contract to dismantle the two ships at their Sydport facility at Sydney, Nova Scotia.

See also
 Fleet of the Royal Canadian Navy
  - Survey vessel in the Canadian Coast Guard

References

External links
 Defence R&D Canada – Atlantic

Auxiliary research ship classes
Fleet of the Royal Canadian Navy
Cold War naval ships of Canada
Auxiliary ships of the Royal Canadian Navy
1968 ships